Falseuncaria lechriotoma is a species of moth of the family Tortricidae. It is found in China (Hebei) and Mongolia.

References

Moths described in 1970
Cochylini